The Man Who Wasn't There is a 2001 American neo-noir crime film written, directed, and produced by Joel and Ethan Coen. It stars Billy Bob Thornton, Frances McDormand, Michael Badalucco, Richard Jenkins, Scarlett Johansson, Jon Polito, Tony Shalhoub, and James Gandolfini. The film is set in 1949 and tells the story of Ed Crane, a withdrawn barber who leads an ordinary life in a small California town with his wife, who he suspects is having an affair with her boss. Crane's situation changes when a stranger comes to the barbershop and offers him the opportunity to join him as a partner in a promising new business, in exchange for an investment of ten thousand dollars. Drawn to the idea, Crane plans to blackmail his wife's lover for the money.

The film is in black-and-white and employs voiceover narration, honoring classic film noir. It differs by including classical music, setting the plot in a small town, and featuring a protagonist from outside the criminal underworld. The Coens began developing the idea from a 1940s haircut poster they saw while filming The Hudsucker Proxy. The plot was influenced by James M. Cain's crime novels, primarily Double Indemnity, The Postman Always Rings Twice, and Mildred Pierce. Aesthetically, The Man Who Wasn't There was inspired by films from the 1940s and 1950s—including Shadow of a Doubt—along with science fiction films and documentaries of the period.

Filming took place on location in California. It was shot in color, later converted to black and white. The film premiered and participated in the official selection at the 2001 Cannes Film Festival, where Joel Coen won the award for  best director. Its theatrical response was lukewarm. However, it was well-received by film critics, who praised Roger Deakins' cinematography and the performances, especially Thornton's character. Media critics in The Guardian, the BBC, and The Austin Chronicle referred to it as one of the best films of the year. The National Board of Review included it among its top ten films of the year and awarded Thornton best actor. Deakins received a nomination for the Academy Award for Best Cinematography and the film achieved multiple nominations and awards from other organizations.

Synopsis

The film is set in 1949 in the town of Santa Rosa, California. Ed Crane is married to Doris, a bookkeeper with a drinking problem, and works in a barbershop that is owned by his brother-in-law, Frank. A customer named Creighton Tolliver tells Ed that he is a businessman looking for investors to invest $10,000 in a new technology called dry cleaning. Ed decides to collect money by anonymously blackmailing Doris's boss, "Big Dave" Brewster, whom he suspects is having an affair with her. Brewster embezzles money from his department store to pay the blackmail. However, Brewster soon pieces together the scheme and beats Tolliver to death after he implicates Ed. Brewster confronts Ed at the store and attempts to kill him, but Ed fatally stabs Brewster with a cigar knife in self-defense.

After irregularities in the store's books are found, the police arrest Doris on the assumption that she embezzled the money and murdered Brewster. Ed is persuaded to hire Freddy Riedenschneider, a defense attorney from Sacramento, who arrives and takes up residence in the most expensive hotel in town. He proceeds to live lavishly on Doris's defense fund, which Frank obtained by mortgaging the barbershop. It is all for nothing because on the morning of the trial Doris hangs herself in her cell. It is later revealed that she was pregnant when she hanged herself but had not had sex with Ed for years. Riedenschneider leaves town while Frank, deeply in debt, drinks heavily. Ed regularly visits Rachel "Birdy" Abundas, a friend's teenage daughter, to hear her play the piano. Tormented by loneliness, he imagines helping her start a musical career and becoming her manager. The fantasy is crushed when a music teacher tells him that Abundas has no talent. On the way back from visiting the teacher, Abundas makes a pass at Ed and attempts to perform oral sex on him, causing Ed to lose control of the car and crash.

Ed wakes up in a hospital bed where the police arrest him for murder. Tolliver's beaten body has been found with Ed's investment contract. The police speculate that Ed coerced Doris into embezzling the investment money, and killed Tolliver when he found out. Ed mortgages his house and hires Riedenschneider for his defense. During Riedenschneider's opening statement, Frank attacks Ed, and a mistrial is declared. With no means left for his defense, Ed throws himself at the mercy of the court. The tactic fails, and the judge sentences him to death. While waiting on death row, Ed writes his story to sell to a pulp magazine. Shortly before his execution, Ed sees a UFO outside the jailhouse. As Ed is electrocuted, he reflects on his fate, regretting none of his decisions and hoping to see Doris in the afterlife, both of them free of the mortal world's imperfections.

Cast

 Billy Bob Thornton as Ed Crane
 Frances McDormand as Doris Crane
 Michael Badalucco as Frank Raffo
 Richard Jenkins as Walter Abundas
 Scarlett Johansson as Rachel "Birdy" Abundas
 Jon Polito as Creighton Tolliver
 Tony Shalhoub as Freddy Riedenschneider
 James Gandolfini as Big Dave Brewster
 Katherine Borowitz as Ann Nirdlinger Brewster
 Christopher Kriesa as Officer Persky
 Brian Haley as Officer Krebs
 Jack McGee as P.I. Burns

Background
The idea of writing a film starring a barber was inspired by a poster that the Coen brothers saw while filming The Hudsucker Proxy (1994). "We filmed a scene in a barbershop, and there was a poster on the wall showing all the different 1940s-style haircuts," recalled Joel Coen. "It was a fixture on the set, and we were always looking at it. So we started thinking about the guy who actually did the haircuts, and the story began to take shape. It really evolved from that haircut poster." The directors took the title of the film from the 1899 poem written by William Hughes Mearns entitled "Antigonish" and they chose it in reference to the character of the barber, to reflect his emotional emptiness.

Set in 1949, the plot—according to Joel Coen—"is heavily influenced" by the work of writer James M. Cain, in particular, the novels Double Indemnity, The Postman Always Rings Twice, and Mildred Pierce. story, The Coens replaced the underworld setting with a typical American town with ordinary people. "The criminal element here is sort of inadvertent. The hero sort of stumbles into it," Ethan Coen explained. This storytelling device was an homage to Cain's literary, whose stories usually featured characters with conventional jobs who, motivated by need or greed, ended up involved in a crime. Other conventions were present in The Man Who Wasn't There, such as the plan to get money quickly, sexual misadventures, and coincidences of fate. The failure of a "perfect plan" to raise money appears in Double Indemnity and The Postman Always Rings Twice, both novels narrated by down-and-out working-class men during the Great Depression.

The Coens named Shadow of a Doubt as a reference to the film and had in mind  the science fiction genre of the 1950s. The film's aesthetics were influenced by science fiction cinema and "cheap documentaries of the '50s". Cinematographer Roger Deakins drew inspiration for his work from the 1940s and 1950s films such as This Gun for Hire, The Blue Dahlia, Kiss Me Deadly, and Touch of Evil. Likewise, The Atlantic Christopher Orr compared the voiceover and Crane's reserved character with the character of Robert Mitchum in the film Out of the Past (1947). The Coens referred to other works through characer names, as in the department store Nirdlinger or Dietrichson —surnames used in Double Indemnity—Riedenschneider —the surname of a character from The Asphalt Jungle — or the name of Tolliver's hotel, "The Hobart Arms", an homage to the novel The Big Sleep by Raymond Chandler.

In addition to Cain's novels and film noir, the story borrowed ideas from existentialist literature, such as Albert Camus's The Stranger. In addition to noting the similarities in both works, authors and critics compared the disconnection with reality and Ed's attitude with that of the protagonist of Camus's novel. Through his main character, The Man Who Wasn't There explores the existentialist view of despair, a theme reminiscent of philosopher Søren Kierkegaard. Authors Jean-Pierre Boulé and Enda McCaffrey compared Crane's attempt to escape from his routine life with Jean-Paul Sartre's idea of a "search for transcendence". The film represented the protagonist's relationship with the dry cleaning business, Abundas, and UFOs. Although The Man Who Wasn't There, cataloged as postmodern, inherited film noir thematic and narrative elements, at the same time it explored concepts of the post World War II period, portraying America's early postwar years. The story was contextualized by events such as UFOs, references to the bombings of Hiroshima and Nagasaki, Werner Heisenberg's reflections on humanity, and the idea of ​​succeeding in an age of opportunity. The plot alludes to Heisenberg's uncertainty principle through the character of defense attorney  Riedenschneider, who refers to principle more than once.

Production

Development
The Coen brothers began writing the script in the mid-1990s, after filming The Big Lebowski. The brothers moved to Ireland — where Frances McDormand was working—to continue writing. The Coens sent the script to producers Eric Fellner and Tim Bevan of Working Title; they intended to start production in 1999, but taking advantage of the availability of George Clooney, they dedicated themselves to O Brother, Where Art Thou? Thereafter they continued with The Man Who Wasn't There. The project was financed independently by Working Title, who raised an approximate budget of $20 million.

The Coens wrote the characters of Doris and Frank for McDormand and Michael Badalucco, respectively. The directors grabbed Thornton, an actor with whom they had not worked before, for the title role. He accepted the role before reading the script: "I knew that it would be good. There are certain people you know you can't go wrong with." The Coens convinced Gandolfini to be the boss. Jon Polito and Tony Shalhoub, two other actors already known to the Coens, joined the cast, followed by Adam Alexi-Malle, Katherine Borowitz, Richard Jenkins, and Johansson. Jenkins initially declined the opportunity to star because he had been rejected from three previous productions of the Coens. However, the directors eventually chose him for the role. Bill Murray was considered for the role that would ultimately be Thornton's.

Filming
Filming began on June 26, 2000, in California and ended on September 1, after ten weeks. Deakins' cinematography was simple and traditional. Most of the shots were taken with the camera at eye level, with normal lenses and a long depth of field. Compared to older American film noir, Deakins used a wide range of grays and attempted to create low contrast without many strong shadows, using fewer and larger lights. He used contemporary technologies and wanted the film to reflect the era in which it was made: "we're not trying to make an old movie", said Deakins. It was filmed in 35 mm format in color and converted to black and white during post-production. This procedure was due, in part, to technical reasons since in recent decades the availability of black and white film rolls had become scarce. However, due to contractual and marketing requirements, it was released in color in some countries. "The film wasn't made to be seen in color", stated Joel Coen, mentioning that in color it would look "horribly out of place" due to grayscale neutralizing colors outside the time frame of the plot.

The set and costume design by Dennis Gassner and Mary Zophres, respectively, had to adapt to the absence of color, avoiding distracting high contrasts. Black and white also affected the actors, intensifying some elements: "Just a close-up is very striking because of the shadows and the sense of depth," said McDormand. However, the team did not lose sight of the color version and designed the locations avoiding bright colors and preferring browns and grays. Ed Crane's clothing consisted of sports jackets, gabardine and rayon shirts. Typical of those years, her stockings had no elastic at the top, and — like the extras — she used garters to hold them up. Women's clothing included seamed stockings, girdles, and pointy bras. Defense attorney Freddy Riedenschneider's peaked lapel double-breasted suit was inspired by Salvador Dalí, according to costume designer Mary Zophres: "It's a bit unusual for the time and suggests opulence."

To compose his character's look, Thornton looked at images of figures from that decade and borrowed some elements from Raymond Burr and Frank Sinatra. The actor commented, "once you get the right look, everything in your attitude changes". When Ed appears on screen, he is almost always seen smoking a Chesterfield. Professional barbers trained Thornton and Badalucco.

Locations

Filming began in the abandoned Lincoln Heights Jail in Los Angeles to set a Santa Rosa city jail cell. Later, the team moved to East Los Angeles and then to the Musso & Frank Grill restaurant on Hollywood Boulevard, where Ed Crane meets his attorney for the first time. Filming continued in Thousand Oaks for two days to shoot the country wedding scenes. Before his scenes, Michael Badalucco had to practice on pigs for the scene where he rides one. The production then returned to Los Angeles to film in a Presbyterian church on Wilshire Boulevard and in Downtown Los Angeles, where it was filmed in an apartment complex that was used to make the hotel lobby scenes. An abandoned Bank of America located also in the center was used for the scenes where Ed goes to the bank. The Nirdlingers building, where Doris works as an accountant, was created from an abandoned furniture store located in Glendale, production designer Dennis Gassner recalled:

A significant portion of the filming took place over a day in the city of Orange, which was used to represent the exteriors of the town of Santa Rosa, where the majority of the film is set. Although only one day was shot in Orange, the team worked for more than two weeks setting the streets according to the year 1949: traffic signs were replaced, facades were modified and minor street repairs were made. The exterior scenes of Ed Crane's house were filmed in the Pasadena neighborhood of Bungalow Heaven, a popular and affordable location in the mid-twentieth century. The Coens chose the house with the lower ceiling to achieve the impression of a smaller space and thus represent the economic situation of the barber. The scenes in the piano teacher's room were also shot in Pasadena, exactly in the Green Hotel building complex. Locations were used to film almost the entire film except for a few scenes, such as the barbershop scenes—the last ones before the end of filming—on a set built by Gassner at Paramount Studios.

Music
The film's soundtrack consists of classical music, primarily piano sonatas by Ludwig van Beethoven, interspersed with seven new compositions by Carter Burwell. In addition to Beethoven, the soundtrack included a Mozart composition, "Sull'aria ... che soave zeffiretto". The inclusion of classical music is a resource that distinguishes the film from others in the noir genre. Music editor Todd Kasow was tasked with selecting suitable sonatas for the soundtrack while Burwell began work on a "pianocentric" composition. Some of the compositions feature "cyclical" structures that symbolize the situation the protagonist finds himself in and his difficulty in freeing himself from it, but at the same time, the Coens felt it was essential to the character that the music suggests "a vague longing". Journalist Dan Goldwasser described Burwell's work as "dark and solemn" and wrote that the main composition, "The Trial of Ed Crane", has "a kind of romanticism with just a hint of hope". The Man Who Wasn't There was the ninth film on which Burwell collaborated with the Coen brothers. The Decca Records label released the soundtrack album on October 30, 2001.

Release

Premiere

The film premiered at the Cannes Film Festival on May 13, 2001. After Cannes, the film reached other European film festivals that year such as Edinburgh, Flanders, Warsaw, and Vienna. The distributor USA Films was in charge of its release in the United States, although its screening was limited to select theaters. On October 31, 2001, it premiered in Los Angeles and New York. It was the first Coen film to be released in black and white, something the directors had tried unsuccessfully with Blood Simple (1984) and The Hudsucker Proxy (1994) in the face of the advantages of color distribution.

Home media
The first home edition was available on DVD released by USA Home Entertainment in 2002. DVD extras included commentary by the Coen brothers and Thornton, a sixteen-minute making-of, an interview with Deakins, five deleted scenes, a photo gallery, and promotional videos. The Coens and Thornton share behind-the-scenes anecdotes, including the story about the haircut poster that inspired the idea for the film. In an in-depth interview with Deakins, the cinematographer discusses the pros and cons of shooting in black and white, his aesthetic influences, and his experience working with the Coens. Reviewing the DVD, the site DVD Talk wrote that the black-and-white photography "is brilliantly captured, evoking film-noir history while remaining immaculately clean. The blacks are deep and solid, giving the image an enchanted look." In September 2002, a three-disc DVD edition was released in France: the first with the film in black and white, the second with the color version, and the last with the extras, which as a novelty included a documentary of almost fifty minutes entitled "The Film Noir Universe". In 2015 Universal Home Video released a regular version on Blu-ray.

Reception

Box office
The Man Who Wasn't There grossed $7.5 million in the United States and Canada, and $11.4 million in other territories, for a worldwide total of $18.9 million against its $20 million budget. The film was the Coen Brothers' worst-performing film at the box office since The Hudsucker Proxy (1994). Some authors speculated that the result of this failure was due, in part, to the lack of enthusiasm of the mass public towards black and white film. In its opening weekend in the United States, it grossed $664,404 from thirty-nine theaters.

Critical response
  Many critics praised the film for both its technique and its performances. Richard Schickel of Time wrote: "The ability to show no emotion isn't a highly prized quality in movie leads, but Thornton, that splendid actor, does it perfectly as Ed Crane, a taciturn small-town barber, circa 1949". Other critics also praised Thornton's leading role, such as Emanuel Levy, who opined that Thornton "beautifully absolves himself in a challenging role that demands more reaction than action" and added, "he comes across as a tormented Montgomery Clift". Variety wrote that the film's protagonist "sets new standards of opacity and passivity".

Jonathan Rosenbaum of the Chicago Reader noted: "Joel and Ethan Coen stay true to their penchant for bumbling, neo-noir heroes, and their firm belief that life normally turns out lavishly horrific." Roger Ebert of the Chicago Sun-Times commented, "The film is effective and confident in its style, so loving and so intense that if you see it often, it will be like a party." In the same way, Peter Travers of Rolling Stone named it one of the best films of the year and expressed that it is "devilishly funny" and highlighted the photography and performances. Travers included The Man Who Wasn't There at number eight on his list of the ten best indie films of 2001. Peter Bradshaw of The Guardian stated: "It's the best American film of the year" and Philip French, in another review for The Guardian, also claimed that it was the best film of the year up to that point. Likewise, Marc Savlov of Austin Chronicle announced that it was "the most beautiful film of the year" and added that "Billy Bob Thornton's performance represents a dazzling rough diamond". The BBC Critic Nev Pierce also described it as "one of the best films of the year" and added about its viewing that it was "a unique, peculiar, captivating experience."

Deakins's black-and-white photography was singled out by several critics. The Chicago Reader compared the photograph to Federico Fellini's 8½ and reviewer Matthew Turner of View London commented that black and white "hasn't looked this splendid since the 1940s". Despite writing a lukewarm review, Todd McCarthy in Variety praised Deakins' work, Dennis Gassner's sets and Mary Zophres' costumes to create a "superior representation of the post-war period in a small town". Concerning the rural setting, the historian José María Caparrós pointed out: "Few times has American cinema appeared in such a subtle and forceful way to testify the deep existential emptiness and the mediocrity of deep America". The film did not convince Michael Sragow of The Baltimore Sun, who said: "The Man Who Wasn't There is an intellectualized, stylized, completely empty period production. Despite its lavish, claustrophobically controlled black-and-white look, it packs the punch of a toy gun." Similarly, David Denby of The New Yorker called it a “dud academic exercise”.

Awards and nominations

After its premiere at the Cannes Film Festival, Joel Coen took home Best Director No. 3 and shared the award with David Lynch for Mulholland Drive. The film was also nominated for the Palme d'Or, the festival's highest honor, but Nanni Moretti's The Son's Room won the prize. The film was part of the selection of the ten best of the year by the National Board of Review.

The film was nominated for a statuette at the 74th Academy Awards in the category of Best Cinematography (Deakins), although the award ultimately went to Andrew Lesnie for The Lord of the Rings: The Fellowship of the Ring. Also, the film received three nominations for the Golden Globe Awards in the categories of best dramatic film, best screenplay, and best dramatic actor (Thornton), but failed to win any.

Deakins won the Best Cinematography award at the BAFTA Awards. Additionally, Deakins received multiple accolades from other organizations, including the American Society of Cinematographers, the Boston Society of Film Critics, the Los Angeles Film Critics Association, the New York Film Critics Online, the Society Film Critics Online and the Satellite Awards, among others.

Notes

References

External links

 

2001 films
2001 crime drama films
American crime drama films
BAFTA winners (films)
2000s English-language films
Films directed by the Coen brothers
American black-and-white films
Films about capital punishment
Films set in 1949
Films set in the San Francisco Bay Area
Films shot in California
American neo-noir films
Working Title Films films
Focus Features films
Films scored by Carter Burwell
Gramercy Pictures films
USA Films films
French-language Canadian films
2000s American films